This is a list of the 32 members of the European Parliament for Romania in the 2014 to 2019 session.

List

References

2014
List
Romania